What Lies Beneath is a 2000 American supernatural horror-thriller film.

What Lies Beneath may also refer to:

Music
What Lies Beneath (Robin Trower album), 2009
What Lies Beneath (Tarja album), 2010
"What Lies Beneath", a song by Breaking Benjamin from Dear Agony, 2009

Television episodes
"What Lies Beneath" (According to Jim)
"What Lies Beneath" (All Saints)
"What Lies Beneath" (Black-ish)
"What Lies Beneath" (Di-Gata Defenders)
"What Lies Beneath" (Durham County)
"What Lies Beneath" (The Gates)
"What Lies Beneath" (Generator Rex)
"What Lies Beneath" (Holby City)
"What Lies Beneath" (McLeod's Daughters)
"What Lies Beneath" (Miami Medical)
"What Lies Beneath" (My Little Pony: Friendship Is Magic)
"What Lies Beneath" (Painkiller Jane)
"What Lies Beneath" (Quatermass)
"What Lies Beneath" (Sea Patrol)
"What Lies Beneath" (The Vampire Diaries)
"What Lies Beneath" (Yu-Gi-Oh! GX)
"What Lies Beneath", an episode of Tracker

See also
"What Lies Below", an episode of Fringe